Ctenucha refulgens is a moth of the family Erebidae. It is found in Ecuador.

References

refulgens
Moths described in 1899